Dave Dennis (born 20 January 1986) is an Australian rugby union player who plays professionally for the LA Giltinis of Major League Rugby (MLR) in the United States. His primary position is lock or blindside flanker, but can also play No.8.

Early life
He was educated at Richmond High School in Sydney, when he played in the Australian Schoolboys Rugby team in 2004.

Waratahs
Dennis' Waratahs debut was against the Crusaders, in 2007. In March 2013, Dennis became Waratahs captain.

Exeter Chiefs
In 2016 he joined Exeter Chiefs. He started the final as Exeter Chiefs defeated Wasps to be crowned champions of the 2016–17 English Premiership.

References

External links
 ARU Wallabies profile
 Waratahs profile

1986 births
Rugby union players from Sydney
Australia international rugby union players
New South Wales Waratahs players
Rugby union flankers
Living people
Sydney Stars players
Exeter Chiefs players
Australian expatriate rugby union players
Expatriate rugby union players in England
Australian expatriate sportspeople in England
LA Giltinis players
Australian rugby union players